The 2014 FIA WTCC Race of Hungary was the third round of the 2014 World Touring Car Championship season and the fourth running of the FIA WTCC Race of Hungary. It was held on 4 May 2014 at the Hungaroring in Mogyoród near Budapest, Hungary.

Race one was won by Yvan Muller for Citroën Total WTCC and race two was won by Gianni Morbidelli for ALL–INKL.com Münnich Motorsport.

Background
After two rounds, José María López led the drivers' championship by twelve points over teammate Sébastien Loeb. Franz Engstler held the lead of the Yokohama Trophy.

The compensation weight system came into effect for the third round of the championship.

Tom Coronel returned after being forced to miss the Race of France due to damage sustained to his Chevrolet Cruze at the opening round of the season. After initially expecting to miss the practice sessions while final repairs were made, Coronel was able to take part in Friday testing. NIKA Racing entered a TC2 Honda Civic for Yukinori Taniguchi who will be racing at selected events in 2014.

Report

Testing and free practice
Gabriele Tarquini led a Honda 1–2–3 in Friday testing, Mehdi Bennani in the Proteam Racing–run car was second with Tiago Monteiro third.

López set the pace in free practice one on a drying track. Yvan Muller was second fastest but 1.2 seconds off the time set by his teammate, while Tom Chilton was third in the ROAL Motorsport Chevrolet.

Yvan Muller led a Citroën 1–2–3 in free practice two, Bennani in fourth was the highest placed Honda and Chilton in sixth was the fastest Chevrolet.

Qualifying
López was quickest in the first part of qualifying with Bennani and Muller having topped the times earlier on in the session. Robert Huff had been close to making it through to Q2 but he was knocked out of the top twelve following a late improvement by Hugo Valente. Pasquale di Sabatino took pole position in the TC2 class.

Tarquini set the benchmark time in Q2 and ensured he would progress through to Q3. López was second, Monteiro third and Muller and Loeb taking the last two spots for the final part of qualifying. Bennani missed out on Q3 due to Monteiro's late improvement while Valente and Michelisz spoiled their lap times with mistakes, ending the session 11th and 12th respectively. Dušan Borković finished tenth to secure pole position for race two.

Muller claimed pole in the Q3 shootout at the head of a Citroën 1–2–3 while Monteiro was the best of the Castrol Honda World Touring Car Team pair who ended up fourth and fifth.

The Campos Racing car of Borković failed the ride height test in post–qualifying scrutineering and had all of his qualifying times disallowed, sending him to the back of the grid for both races. This moved Valente up to pole position for race two.

Race One
Monteiro and Tarquini passed Loeb at the start while Muller kept ahead of López. Loeb lost further places to Bennani and Michelisz who had moved up from 11th on the grid on the opening lap. Chilton and Coronel had slight contact early on and on lap three, Chilton was shown a black and orange flag for his loose bonnet. By the midpoint of the race the Lukoil Lada Sport cars of Huff and Thompson were under threat from the Campos Racing cars of Valente and Borković. Morbidelli had passed the Lada pair earlier and now fellow Chevrolet racers Valente and Borkovic were trying to pass. A slide from Huff on lap nine opened up a gap for Valente to pass. After 14 laps Muller led a Citroën 1–2 with Monteiro taking the final podium place. Di Sabatino won in the TC2 class.

Race Two
Morbidelli got a better start than Valente who also lost out to Monteiro at the start. There was slight contact between Coronel and the best placed Citroën of Muller; Muller dived up the inside of Coronel at the start of the second lap although Coronel made the switch back to retain fourth place. By lap seven Coronel was still keeping Muller and Lopez behind, allowing Morbidelli, Monteiro and Valente to break away from the rest of the field. Monteiro was by now putting Morbidelli under pressure for first place. On lap twelve Muller began to come under pressure from López which reduced the pressure on Coronel ahead of them, the trio had spent much of the race running together. Morbidelli made a mistake on the final lap at the turn six chicane, Monteiro closed up and Valente also tried to have a go at Monteiro although no positions changed. Morbidelli crossed the finish line to claim his first win for ALL–INKL.com Münnich Motorsport ahead of Monteiro and Valente. Coronel held off Muller all the way to the end to finish fourth. Engstler was victor in the TC2 class.

Prior to the Race of Austria, Lukoil Lada Sport's James Thompson was disqualified from the previous three races after the seal on his engine was found to have been broken without permission. This included both races in Hungary and the race in Slovakia.

Results

Qualifying

Bold denotes Pole position for second race.

 — After failing the ride height check after qualifying, Borković had all his qualifying times disallowed.

Race 1

Bold denotes Fastest lap.

Race 2

Bold denotes Fastest lap.

Standings after the event

Drivers' Championship standings

Yokohama Trophy standings

Manufacturers' Championship standings

 Note: Only the top five positions are included for both sets of drivers' standings.

References

External links
World Touring Car Championship official website

Hungary
FIA WTCC Race of Hungary
FIA WTCC Race of Hungary